William Norris King (December 3, 1890 – July 1, 1937) was an American rugby union player who played in the back row for the United States men's national team in its first two capped matches in 1912 and 1913.

Biography
William King was born on December 3, 1890 in San Mateo, California, the son of Frederic Randolph King and Edith King (born Boswell). He was the grandson of minister and noted orator, Thomas Starr King.

As a freshman at the University of California, King was a member of the varsity rugby team. While at the university, King played primarily at lock. On November 16, 1912, King played for the United States at flanker in its first capped match against Australia—a 12–8 loss. On November 15, 1913, King returned to the United States team, playing at number eight against New Zealand—a 51–3 defeat. By August 1914, King had withdrawn from the University of California and was consequently no longer a member of the rugby team.

After attending the University of California and playing for the United States team, King became a rancher. William King died on July 1, 1937 at the age of 46.

References

1890 births
1937 deaths
American rugby union players
United States international rugby union players
Rugby union flankers
Rugby union number eights
Rugby union locks
People from San Mateo, California
California Golden Bears rugby players